University rowing in the United Kingdom began when it was introduced to Oxford in the late 18th century. The first known race at a university took place at Oxford in 1815 between Brasenose and Jesus and the first inter-university boat race, between Oxford and Cambridge, was rowed on 10 June 1829.

Today, many universities have a rowing club and at some collegiate universities, Oxford, Cambridge, Durham, and London, each college has its own club as well as a main university club. In contrast to the Oxford/Cambridge/Durham colleges, London colleges are members of British Universities and Colleges Sport in their own right, and thus compete in inter-university competitions. In Scotland, the rowing clubs of Glasgow University and Edinburgh University initiated an annual race in 1877, making this competition the second oldest in the United Kingdom. Competitive university rowing in Northern Ireland began in the 1930s with the formation of Queen's University Belfast Boat Club in 1931, whose first inter-varsity races were a triangular tournament against Glasgow University and University College Dublin in 1934–35 and who entered the Wylie Cup (which had been running between Irish universities since 1922) from 1937 to 1938. The Welsh Boat Race began in 2006.

A 2016 article identified six university clubs which "dominate rowing among higher education institutions": Oxford Brookes, Imperial College, London, Newcastle, Durham and Reading. With the exception of Reading, these are all designated by British Rowing as High Performance Programmes, a scheme that also involves Edinburgh as well as three non-university clubs.

BUCS

Most universities compete in the British Universities and Colleges Sport (BUCS) Championships with a number of events over the year.  For non-indoor events, boats are separated into Championship (where "BUCS points" are available), Intermediate and Beginner (for students in their first year of the sport).

On 16 June 2008, UCS (who represented the professional staff working in the sector) and BUSA (the body for competitive sport in the sector) merged to form "BUCS" – British Universities and Colleges Sport. Events from 2008/09 onwards therefore come under the BUCS banner, rather than BUSA, e.g. BUCS Regatta rather than BUSA regatta.

BUCS events contribute "BUCS Points" (for Championship boats) towards the (multi-sport) BUCS championship. Since 2011–12, a breakdown of points by sport has also been available. The highest ranked universities in rowing since then have been:

BUCS Small Boats Head
The Small Boats Head is held in October. The event was introduced in 2006 and first held on the Trent in Nottingham, small boats having previously competed in the BUSA Championship Head. The 2007 event, held in December, saw 4s included in the Small Boats Head and Durham compete for the first time, dominating the medal table. In 2008 the event was again held in October but moved to the Witham in Boston, Lincolnshire, where it now runs in conjunction with the GB Rowing Team 1st Senior/U23 Assessment. The 2012 head saw Durham's dominance finally broken as, with only the double sculls racing, Imperial topped the medal table with a single gold, a silver and a bronze. Imperial won again the following year, with only the single sculls racing.

Note that as the Small Boats Head is an autumn event, the 4s and 8s Head and Regatta from the same BUCS season are held on the following year, e.g. the 2015 Small Boats Head is part of the 2015–16 BUCS season along with the 2016 4s and 8s Head and the 2016 Regatta.

BUCS Indoor Rowing Series (UIRS)
BUCS Rowing and British Rowing have managed an annual autumn indoor rowing series at a number of universities and other centres across the UK since 2010, when it started with 11 centres and ran from late November to mid December. In 2016, thirteen centres hosted events from late October to the end of November.

BUCS 4s and 8s Head
This is a  head race which has been run in February or March since 2003 (originally as the BUSA Championship Head). The event grew rapidly, becoming the largest university heads race in the world by 2007, despite the small boats being split into a separate head (see above) after the 2006 event. It was held on the River Trent in Nottingham until 2009, when the decision was made to move the event to the River Nene in Peterborough, and to split the competition into 2 separate days, with Beginners racing over a shorter  course on one day, and Seniors racing on the longer course on the other. However, due to inclement weather, the event was cancelled. The event was again held in Peterborough in 2010, 2011 and 2012, and was due to be held there in 2013. However, due to flooding, the event was moved to Boston that year, with Newcastle topping the medal table.

The 2014 event was cancelled due to bad weather, It was held in Boston again in 2015, with racing on Saturday only for the intermediate and championship crews. Newcastle topped the medal table and won the men's Victor Ludorum while Durham, who were second in the medal table, took the women's Victor Ludorum and the overall Victor Ludorum.

In 2015, BUCS sought a new host for a three-year period (2016–2018). The event subsequently moved to the Tyne, hosted by Tyne United Rowing Club, Tyne Amateur Rowing Club and Newcastle University Boat Club in 2016. Newcastle won both the overall and men's Victor Ludorum, with Edinburgh winning the women's Victor Ludorm. The first day of the 2017 event, also on the Tyne, had to be cancelled due to poor weather, but the second day (for senior crews) went ahead, with London topping the medal table and taking the Victor Ludorum. The 2018 event saw separate men's and women's Victor Ludorum awards, with London taking the women's prize and Newcastle taking the men's. From 2019, the event was to be held for three years on the Gloucester and Sharpness Canal, hosted by the University of Bristol, Hartpury University Centre and Gloucester Rowing Club. Newcastle took the Men's and Overall Victor Ludorum in 2019, with Edinburgh taking the Women's. However, it reverted to the Tyne in 2020 after only one year. The 2020 event was shortened due to bad weather, with only the intermediate and championship races taking place. Newcastle University topped the medal table with ten medals, four gold, as well as winning the men's, women's and overall Victor Ludorum. The 2021 event was cancelled due to COVID, but it returned to the Tyne for 2022 and 2023. Newcastle took the overall and men's Victor Ludorum in 2022, with Durham taking the women's. In 2023, Durham achieved a clean sweep with the women's, men's and overall Victor Ludorum.

BUCS Regatta
A 2 km regatta held (usually at Holme Pierrepont) over the May Day weekend. Points for the Victor Ludorum are awarded for finishing places in the finals (more points for champ events and bigger boats).

The regatta was first run (as the BUSA regatta) in 1994, replacing the UAU 'Regatta' that had been a two-hour slot for University races in the Nottingham City Regatta. The first Regatta attracted 105 crews; by 2000 this had grown to 354. The 2001 Regatta was the first to be held over two days, and attracted over 500 crews. In 2006 the Regatta grew to three days with almost 1000 crews taking part.

In its early years the Regatta was dominated by Nottingham, but in 2004 it was won for the first time by Durham. In 2005 Durham were 1st again, followed by Reading University in 2nd place and University of London behind them in 3rd place. Durham's dominance continued until 2014, when London took the trophy, with Durham 2nd and Imperial College 3rd.

2014 also saw the introduction of separate Victor Ludorum trophies for men's and women's teams in addition to the overall trophy: Durham took the women's prize and Imperial the men's. 2015 saw Durham retain the women's title and Newcastle the men's, with Durham taking the overall title. Newcastle's men retained their trophy in 2016 and Newcastle University won the overall trophy for the first time. The University of London won the 2016 women's trophy on gold medal count, having finished equal on points with Exeter.

In 2008 the BUSA regatta was held at Strathclyde Country Park, as NWSC was not available that weekend. Two weeks earlier, a BUSA Sprint Regatta was held at Cotswold Water Park, though the regatta had to be held as a time trial because the weather had prevented the course and stakeboats being laid.

Results

Other competitions

Head of the River Race
The Head of the River Race for men's eights, rowed on the Championship Course on the Tideway, awarded the Ortner Shield (named after Reading University coach Frank Ortner) to the fastest University Athletics Union (UAU) crew (later BUSA crew) from 1961 to 2005. The first winners were Reading, but the shield was dominated by Durham from the mid 1960s to the mid 1980s, who also won the final shield in 2005.

In 2006 the "University Prize" replaced the Ortner Shield. This was restricted to university and college crews of Senior 2 (now Intermediate 1) status or lower, with no higher-status entries from that institute, affiliated to British Rowing, Scottish Rowing or Welsh Rowing. This was later renamed the Halladay Trophy, after Durham coach Eric Halladay, and joined by the Bernard Churcher Trophy, an unrestricted prize for universities from anywhere in the world – boats may only be entered for one of these trophies, even if eligible for both.

Women's Eights Head of the River Race

The Women's Eights Head of the River Race is, like the men's counterpart, raced on the Championship Course on the Tideway. University crews from anywhere in the world compete for the University Pennant; from 1999 to 2005 there was also a separate prize for the top BUSA-affiliated crew.

University races
A number of university boat clubs have organised annual races between themselves.  These include:

Oxford and Cambridge – The Boat Race and Women's Boat Race (The Boat Races) and the Henley Boat Races
Durham and Newcastle – The Boat Race of the North
Bristol and UWE – Bristol Boat Race
Edinburgh and Glasgow – The Scottish Boat Race
De Montfort University and University of Leicester – Varsity of Leicester
Aberdeen and Robert Gordon University – Aberdeen Universities Boat Race
Manchester and Salford – Two Cities Boat Race
Birmingham and University of Warwick – Varsity Boat Race
Trinity College, Dublin and Queens University Belfast – Irish University Boat Race
Swansea University and Cardiff University – The Welsh Boat Race
University of Stirling and University of Dundee – Tayforth Boat Race

Some universities include rowing in multi-sport inter-university competitions:

 Queen Mary, University of London (non-medical section) and Barts and The London, Queen Mary's School of Medicine and Dentistry (medical school of QMUL) – Part of the Merger Cup
Liverpool, Leeds and Manchester – part of the Christie Cup
University of Northumbria and Newcastle University – part of the Stan Calvert Cup
University of Sheffield and Sheffield Hallam University – part of the Varsity
Kingston Student Rowing Club and University of Surrey Boat Club – part of the Varsity (until 2016)
York and Lancaster – Part of Roses Tournament
University of Derby and University of Northampton – Part of the Varsity Match

Collegiate universities also hold inter-collegiate competitions. The include:

Cambridge (organised by Cambridge University Combined Boat Clubs): 
University IVs 
Lent Bumps 
Small Boats Regatta 
May Bumps 
Durham (organised by Durham College Rowing):
Autumn Senate Cup (regatta)
Autumn Novice Cup (regatta)
Spring Senate Cup (regatta)
Spring Novice Cup (1.8 km head race)
Hayward Cup (4 km head race on the Tees)
London:
Allom Cup
United Hospitals regatta, head race and bumps races (for London medical, veterinary and allied students)
Oxford (organised by Oxford University Rowing Clubs):
Autumn Fours
Isis Winter League 
Torpids (bumps race)
Eights Week (bumps race)

University boat clubs

England

Anglia Ruskin Boat Club 
Aston University Rowing Club
Bath University Boat Club 
University of Birmingham Boat Club 
Birmingham City University Rowing Club
Bournemouth University Boat Club 
University of Bradford Rowing Club 
University of Bristol Boat Club
Brunel University Rowing Club
Cambridge University Boat Club 
Cambridge University Women's Boat Club 
Cambridge University Lightweight Rowing Club 

Caius Boat Club 
Christ's College Boat Club 
Churchill College Boat Club 
Clare Boat Club 
Clare Hall Boat Club 
Corpus Christi College Boat Club (Cambridge) 
Darwin College Boat Club 
Downing College Boat Club 
Emmanuel Boat Club 
First and Third Trinity Boat Club 
Fitzwilliam College Boat Club 
Girton College Boat Club 
Homerton College Boat Club 
Hughes Hall Boat Club 
Jesus College Boat Club (Cambridge) 
King's College Boat Club 
Lady Margaret Boat Club 
Lucy Cavendish College Boat Club 
Magdalene Boat Club (Cambridge)
Murray Edwards College Boat Club 
Newnham College Boat Club 
Pembroke College Boat Club (Cambridge) 
Peterhouse Boat Club 
Queens' College Boat Club 
Robinson College Boat Club 
St. Catharine's College Boat Club (Cambridge)
St Edmund's College Boat Club
Selwyn College Boat Club 
Sidney Sussex Boat Club 
Trinity Hall Boat Club 
Wolfson College Boat Club 

Chester University Rowing Club
De Montfort University Rowing Club 
University of Derby Rowing Club
Durham University Boat Club 

Collingwood College Boat Club 
Grey College Boat Club 
Hatfield College Boat Club 
Hild Bede Boat Club 
John Snow College Boat Club 
Butler College Boat Club 
South College Boat Club
St Aidan's College Boat Club 
St Chad's College Boat Club 
St Cuthbert's Society Boat Club 
St John's College Boat Club 
St Mary's College Boat Club 
Stephenson College Boat Club 
Trevelyan College Boat Club 
University College Boat Club 
Ustinov Boat Club 
Van Mildert College Boat Club 

University of East Anglia Boat Club 
University of East London Boat Club
Essex University Rowing Club
Exeter University Boat Club
Gloucestershire University Rowing Club
Harper Adams University Rowing Club   
University of Hertfordshire Rowing Club
Hull University Boat Club 
Imperial College Boat Club 
Keele University Boat Club
University of Kent Rowing Club 
Kingston Students Rowing Club  (Formerly Kingston University Boat Club )
Lancaster University Boat Club 
Leeds University Boat Club 
Leeds Beckett University Rowing Club
University of Leicester Boat Club 
University of Lincoln Rowing Club
Liverpool John Moores University Rowing Club
University of Liverpool Boat Club 
University of London Boat Club 

Imperial College School of Medicine Boat Club 
King's College London Boat Club 
London School of Economics Boat Club 
Queen Mary, University of London Boat Club 
Royal Free and University College Medical School Boat Club 
Royal Holloway, University of London Boat Club
Royal Veterinary College Boat Club
St Bartholomew's and The Royal London Hospitals' Boat Club
St George's Hospital Medical School Boat Club 
University College London Boat Club 
United Hospitals Boat Club

Loughborough Students Rowing
Manchester University Boat Club 
Newcastle University Boat Club 
University of Northampton Rowing Club
Northumbria University Boat Club 
Nottingham University Boat Club 
Nottingham Trent University Rowing Club
Oxford University Boat Club 
Oxford University Women's Boat Club 
Oxford University Lightweight Rowing Club 
Oxford University Women's Lightweight Rowing Club 

Balliol College Boat Club 
Brasenose College Boat Club (Oxford) 
Christ Church Boat Club 
Corpus Christi College Boat Club (Oxford) 
Exeter College Boat Club 
Green Templeton Boat Club 
Hertford College Boat Club 
Jesus College Boat Club (Oxford) 
Keble College Boat Club 
Lady Margaret Hall Boat Club 
Linacre College Boat Club 
Lincoln College Boat Club 
Magdalen College Boat Club 
Mansfield College Boat Club
Merton College Boat Club 
New College Boat Club 
Oriel College Boat Club 
Osler House Boat Club
Pembroke College Boat Club (Oxford) 
Regent's Park College Boat Club 
Somerville College Boat Club
St Anne's College Boat Club
St Antony's College Boat Club
St Benet's Hall Boat Club
St Catherine's College Boat Club 
St Edmund Hall Boat Club 
St Hilda's College Boat Club
St Hughs College Boat Club
St John's College Boat Club
St Peter's College Boat Club 
The Queen's College Boat Club 
Trinity College Boat Club
University College Boat Club (Oxford) 
Wadham College Boat Club
Wolfson College Boat Club
Worcester College Boat Club 

Oxford Brookes University Boat Club 
University of Plymouth Rowing Club
University of Portsmouth Rowing Club
Reading University Boat Club 
Roehampton University Boat Club 
Royal Agricultural University Boat Club
Salford University Boat Club
Sheffield Hallam University Rowing Club
Sheffield University Rowing Club
Southampton University Boat Club 
Southampton Solent University Boat Club
Sunderland University Rowing Club
University of Surrey Boat Club
Teesside University Rowing Club
University of Warwick Boat Club 
University of the West of England Boat Club 
University of Westminster Boat Club
University of Worcester Rowing Club
University of York Boat Club 
York St John University Rowing Club

Northern Ireland
Queen's University Belfast Boat Club 
Queen's University Belfast Ladies Boat Club 
University of Ulster at Coleraine

Scotland
Aberdeen University Boat Club
Dundee University Boat Club
Edinburgh University Boat Club 
Glasgow University Boat Club 
Heriot Watt University Boat Club
Robert Gordon University Boat Club
Stirling University Boat Club
Strathclyde University Boat Club
University of St Andrews Boat Club

Wales
Aberystwyth University Boat Club 
Bangor University Rowing Club 
Cardiff University Rowing Club 
Swansea University Rowing Club

References

External links
BUCS (formerly BUSA) Rowing Page

Rowing in the United Kingdom
Rowing